Armando Pellegrini (born 3 June 1933) is an Italian racing cyclist. He won stage 4 of the 1959 Giro d'Italia.

References

External links
 

1933 births
Living people
Italian male cyclists
Italian Giro d'Italia stage winners
Place of birth missing (living people)
Cyclists from the Province of Bergamo